This is a list of Kosovo men's national basketball team results from 2020 to present.

Fixtures and results

2020

2021

2022

Notes and references

Notes

References

External links
Official website 
Kosovo at FIBA site
Kosovo National Team – Men at Eurobasket.com

Results
Basketball games by national team